Willem de Famars Testas (1834, Utrecht – 1896, Arnhem), was a 19th-century Dutch painter, draughtsman, etcher and illustrator noted for his Orientalist paintings and drawings.

Biography

According to the RKD, he learned to paint from Jacobus Everhardus Josephus van den Berg and studied at the Akademie van beeldende kunsten in the Hague during the years 1853-1854. He travelled to Egypt in 1858-1860 and was in Brussels 1872-1885. He became a member of the artist society Schilder- en teekengenootschap Kunstliefde in Utrecht. His daughter Marie Madelaine de Famars Testas also became a painter.

Gallery

References

News item about Famars testa and the Ezbekieh Square painting on the Teylers Museum website
Willem de Famars Testas on Artnet

1834 births
1896 deaths
Artists from Utrecht
Orientalist painters
19th-century Dutch painters
Dutch male painters
19th-century Dutch male artists